Wolf v. Vidal (known at lower courts as Batalla Vidal v. Nielsen), was a case that was filed to challenge the Trump Administration's rescission of Deferred Action for Childhood Arrivals (DACA). Plaintiffs in the case are DACA recipients who argue that the rescission decision is unlawful under the Administrative Procedure Act and the Fifth Amendment. On February 13, 2018, Judge Garaufis in the Eastern District of New York addressed the question of whether the government offered a legally adequate reason for ending the DACA program. The court found that Defendants did not provide a legally adequate reason for ending the DACA program and that the decision to end DACA was arbitrary and capricious. Defendants have appealed the decision to the Second Circuit Court of Appeals.

Background

Deferred Action for Childhood Arrivals 
On June 15, 2012, the Department of Homeland Security established the Deferred Action for Childhood Arrivals (DACA) program. DACA provides young immigrants who meet specific criteria with protection from deportation and eligibility for work authorization for two years. Since 2012, about 800,000 people have been granted DACA.  On September 5, 2017, President Trump ordered an end to the DACA program and established a phasing out plan for DACA. The termination of the DACA program resulted in various lawsuits challenging the termination.

Case background 
Prior to the Trump administration's rescission of DACA, the legality of a similar program, Deferred Action for Parents of Americans (DAPA) and a work-permit extension of DACA made alongside it, had been challenged by a coalition of 26 states led by Texas in the case United States v. Texas, 579 U.S. ___ (2016). The United States Court of Appeals for the Fifth Circuit had upheld the United States District Court for the Southern District of Texas's 2015 injunction preventing the government from enforcing the DAPA and extension of the DACA program. The federal government had challenged this to the Supreme Court, but due to the recent death of Justice Antonin Scalia, the Court was deadlocked, and left the injunction in place based on the Fifth Circuit's ruling.

Martín Batalla Vidal was the son of undocumented immigrants who had lived in New York City who only learned of his "dreamer" status in 2008. After the original DACA program was offered, Vidal applied in 2014 and had been approved in early 2015 for a three-year work permit. With the Texas District Court's injunction on DAPA and the DACA expansion, Vidal was told by the government that his approval had to be reduced to a two-year work permit, despite the injunction only affirmed to cover the Fifth Circuit states (Texas, Louisiana, and Mississippi). The injunction also affected the ability for his parents to receive deferred action for work permits under DAPA. Vidal gained the help from Make the Road New York, the National Immigration Law Center, and the Worker and Immigrant Rights Advocacy Clinic at the Yale Law School to obtain legal council and file suit against the United States Department of Homeland Security, the agency overseeing the United States Citizenship and Immigration Services which handled the DACA system, around 2016 in the United States District Court for the Eastern District of New York to challenge the agency's nationwide policy based on the circuit injunction.

While Vidal's case was being prosecuted, the Trump administration announced its plan to rescind the DACA entirely in September 2017. Vidal amended his case to assert that this action violated federal law. The amended complaint stated that the government failed to provide an explanation for the reversal of DACA, in violation of the Administrative Procedure Act, and that the Trump Administration's reversal is "unconstitutionally motivated by anti-Mexican and anti-Latino animus, in violation of equal protection component of the Due Process Clause of the Fifth Amendment."

District court 
Vidal's case at the District Court was heard under Judge Nicholas Garaufis, who after the case was amended to include the new claims related to the Trump's administration's decision to rescind DACA, became a noted figure in the DACA debate as he had been found to be harshly critical of the responses the government had made in why they opted to terminate the DACA during questioning.

On February 13, 2018, Garaufis granted Vidal's motion for a preliminary injunction, preventing the government from rescinding the DACA. Garaufis did assert that the government had the authority to end the DACA program. However, he stated that the reasoning provided failed the Administrative Procedure Act (APA) as it was arbitrary and capricious, based on a "plainly incorrect factual premise" that the DACA program was illegal simply because the DAPA had been found illegal via United States v. Texas. Further, Garaufis asserted that there was an internal inconsistency with the Customs office's handling of the DACA, as it was continuing to adjudicate DACA renewal applications at the same time it claimed it was winding down the program.

Supreme Court 
Garaufis' injunction came about a month following a similar injunction preventing the government from rescinding the DACA from California in Department of Homeland Security v. Regents of the University of California (DHS).  In April 2018, Judge John D. Bates of the United States District Court for the District of Columbia also issued a similar injunction against the rescinding in the case Trump v. NAACP (NAACP). As such, these injunctions were considered to have nationwide basis preventing the government from rescinding the program.

The government had begun the appeals process for each of these cases, with Vidal's case appealed to the United States Court of Appeals for the Second Circuit. However, by November 2018, the government opted to bypass the Circuit Courts and petitioned the Supreme Court on all three cases. The Supreme Court accepted the petition on June 28, 2019, consolidating Vidal and NAACP under DHS. Oral hearings were on November 12, 2019.

The Supreme Court issued its decision on June 18, 2020. In the 5-4 majority, the court found that the government's reasons to rescind the DACA program to arbitrary and capricious against the APA, and reversed the order, leaving the DACA program active. The majority opinion, written by Chief Justice John Roberts, stated that they made no evaluation on the legality of the DACA program itself and that the government was free to submit a new regulation to rescind the DACA with better reasoning to fit the APA. Among dissents, Judge Clarence Thomas was critical of the majority for not taking the opportunity for reviewing the constitutionality of the DACA as well.

Concurrent cases

New York 
Batalla Vidal v. Nielsen, 291 F. Supp. 3d 260 (E.D.N.Y. 2018): On February 13, 2018, the District Court granted a motion for a preliminary injunction ordering USCIS to accept DACA applications from people who have had DACA previously.

NY v. Trump, et al.: Appeal in New York v. Trump has been consolidated with the appeal in Batalla Vidal v. Nielsen.

California 
Regents of Univ. of California v. United States Dep't of Homeland Sec., 279 F. Supp. 3d 1011 (N.D. Cal. 2018), aff'd sub nom. Regents of the Univ. of California v. U.S. Dep't of Homeland Sec., 908 F.3d 476 (9th Cir. 2018): On November 8, 2018, the Ninth Circuit Court of Appeals upheld the Northern District Court's nationwide injunction and ordered the Department of Homeland Security to continue accepting DACA renewal applications.

See: Regents of the University of California v. United States Department of Homeland Security

Maryland 
Casa De Maryland v. U.S. Dep't of Homeland Sec., 284 F. Supp. 3d 758 (D. Md. 2018): The U.S. District Court for the District of Maryland decided not to enjoin the termination of DACA. However, the court entered an injunction prohibiting the federal government from sharing DACA applications information with immigrant enforcement. The decision has been appealed and the Fourth Circuit Court of Appeals is expected to issue a decision soon.

District of Columbia 
Nat'l Ass'n for the Advancement of Colored People v. Trump, 298 F. Supp. 3d 209 (D.D.C. 2018), adhered to on denial of reconsideration, 315 F. Supp. 3d 457 (D.D.C. 2018): On August 17, 2018, the court partially stayed its order in ordering USCIS to accept to initial applications and advance parole. Now, USCIS only needs to accept renewal applications.

Texas 
State of Texas, et al., Plaintiffs, v. Kirstjen M. Nielsen, et al., Defendants., (S.D.Tex. 2018): The court denied plaintiff states' motion for a preliminary injunction because of the harm it would cause to DACA recipients.

Subsequent Treatment by Courts 
In Regents of the Univ. of Cal. v. United States Dep't of Homeland Sec., the Ninth Circuit distinguished Batalla Vidal where the district court granted Defendants' motion to dismiss Plaintiff's substantive APA claim that alleged that Defendants arbitrary and capriciously changed DHSs's information-use policy. In Batalla Vidal, the court found that Plaintiffs' had relied on a document that contradicted "their otherwise-unsupported allegation of a change to DHS's information-use policy." The Ninth Circuit found that Regents of the Univ. of Cal. is different from Batalla Vidal because in Regents, the most recent FAQs [document] were not attached to or referenced in any of the complaints. . . "therefore. . . materials outside the complaint cannot be considered on a motion to dismiss."

In Gondal v, United States Dep't of Homeland Sec., the Eastern District of New York found that plaintiffs do "not possess a liberty or property interest in a particular decision under DACA nor an employment authorization card." The court cited Batalla Vidal to explain that because the decision to grant deferred action and work authorization is discretionary, plaintiffs are not entitled to any additional interests that are contingent on that discretionary decision.

In Saget v. Trump, the Eastern District of New York cited Batalla Vidal to support their finding that plaintiffs have plausible alleged that a discriminatory purpose was a motivating factor behind the decision to terminate TPS for Haiti. The court cited language in Batalla Vidal, where Judge Garaufis noted that "liability for discrimination will lie when a biased individual manipulates a non-biased decision-maker into taking discriminatory action."

In 2019, the Southern District of New York held that Batalla Vidal "does not stand for the sweeping proposition that any organization with immigrant clients has standing to sue for violations of the [Immigration National Act] INA." The court found that in De Dandrade v. United States Dep't of Homeland Sec., the organizational plaintiffs do not have a cause of action under the APA or under the Constitution because organizational plaintiffs' interests are "so marginally related" to the purposes of the INA.

Further reading

References 

United States immigration and naturalization case law